This is a list of association football clubs located in Bosnia and Herzegovina, sorted by league and division within the Bosnia and Herzegovina football league system, as of the 2012–13 season. There are 610 football clubs in Bosnia and Herzegovina (306 in Federation of Bosnia and Herzegovina and 304 in Republika Srpska), including clubs who are in resting mode.

First level

There are total of 12 clubs in the top tier of Bosnia and Herzegovina football.

Second level

There are a total of 30 clubs in two leagues when it comes to the second tier of Bosnia and Herzegovina football.

Federation of Bosnia and Herzegovina

Republika Srpska

Third level

There are a total of 88 clubs in six leagues when it comes to the third tier of Bosnia and Herzegovina football.

Federation of Bosnia and Herzegovina

The Second league of the Federation of Bosnia and Herzegovina is divided in four regional leagues: North, Center, South and West.

North

Center

South

West

Republika Srpska

The Second league of the Republika Srpska is divided in two regional leagues: West and East.

West

East

Fourth level

There are a total of 147 clubs in 14 leagues when it comes to the fourth tier of Bosnia and Herzegovina football.

Federation of Bosnia and Herzegovina

The Cantonal leagues of the Federation of Bosnia and Herzegovina are divided in ten leagues: League of Una-Sana Canton, First League of Central Bosnia Canton, Inter-cantonal league of HBŽ/ZHŽ, League of Herzegovina-Neretva Canton, League of Sarajevo Canton - Group A, League of Sarajevo Canton - Group B, League of Bosnian Podrinje Canton, League of Zenica-Doboj Canton, First League of Tuzla Canton and First League of Posavina Canton.

First League of Tuzla Canton

First League of Posavina Canton

League of Sarajevo Canton - Group A

League of Sarajevo Canton - Group B

League of Una-Sana Canton

League of Zenica-Doboj Canton

First League of Central Bosnia Canton

League of Bosnian Podrinje Canton

League of Herzegovina-Neretva Canton

Inter-cantonal League of HBŽ/ZHŽ

Republika Srpska

The Regional leagues of the Republika Srpska are divided in four leagues: West, Center, East and South.

Regional League - West

Regional League - Center

Regional League - East

Regional League - South

Fifth tier

There are a total of 156 clubs in 13 leagues when it comes to the fifth tier of Bosnia and Herzegovina football.

Federation of Bosnia and Herzegovina

The fifth tier of football in Federation of Bosnia and Herzegovina is mostly the second tier of the cantonal leagues with one municipality league divided in two groups. The leagues are: Second League of Tuzla Canton divided into South, North and West (all to First League of Tuzla Canton), Second League of Posavina Canton (to First League of Posavina Canton), Second League of Central Bosnia Canton (to First League of Central Bosnia Canton) and the Municipality League of Visoko divided into Group A and B (both to League of Zenica-Doboj Canton).

Second League of Tuzla Canton - South

Second League of Tuzla Canton - North

Second League of Tuzla Canton - West

Second League of Posavina Canton

Second League of Central Bosnia Canton

Municipality League of Visoko - Group A

Municipality League of Visoko - Group B

Republika Srpska

The fifth tier of football in Republika Srpska is made up of six local leagues which act as the second tier to the regional leagues: Prijedor, Gradiška and Banja Luka (all to Regional League - West), Doboj (to Regional League - Center), Center and Zvornik (to Regional League - East).

 
Bosnia and Herzegovina
clubs
Football clubs